Chris Soentpiet (also known as Chris K. Soentpiet) is a Korean American children's book illustrator and author. He was born in Seoul, South Korea, in 1970. At age 8, he moved to Hawaii to live with his adoptive family. A year later, the Soentpiets relocated to Portland, Oregon. Soentpiet currently lives and works in New York City.

Around Town, a picture book written and illustrated by Soentpiet, marked the artist's debut in 1994. Today, Soentpiet is recognized as an award-winning illustrator in the children's book industry. His books have received numerous honors, including, but not limited to, the International Reading Association Teachers' Choice Award, NAACP Image Award, Parents' Choice Gold Award, Parents Magazine Best Children's Book of the Year, North Carolina Children's Book Award, Georgia Children's Picture Book Award, International Reading Association Notable Children's Book for a Global Society, and ALA Notable Book.  Soentpiet is active on the school visit circuit.

Soentpiet's research for the picture chapter book Peacebound Trains (author: Haemi Balgassi) took him back to his country of birth, South Korea, for the first time since his adoption in 1978. In 1996, Soentpiet won the Society of Illustrators Gold Medal for his paintings in Peacebound Trains. The United States Department of Defense published an online edition of the book and featured it, complete with a Teacher Activity Guide, on the United States of America Korean War Commemoration site. Peacebound Trains is the only book to receive this honor.

On his official website and a number of interviews, the artist credits Ted Lewin and Betsy Lewin for encouraging him to pursue a career as a children's book illustrator.

Books

 Around Town
 A Sign (author: George Ella Lyon)
 Brothers (author: Yin)
 Coolies (author: Yin)
 Dear Santa, Please Come to the 19th Floor (author: Yin)
 Happy Birthday To You! (author: Margot Theis Raven)
 Jin Woo (author: Eve Bunting)
 The Last Dragon (author: Susan Miho Nunes)
 My Brother Martin: A Sister Remembers Growing Up with the Rev. Dr. Martin Luther King Jr. (author: Christine King Farris)
 Momma, Where Are You From? (author: Marie Bradby)
 Molly Bannaky (author: Alice McGill)
 More Than Anything Else (author: Marie Bradby)
 My Brother Martin (author: Christine King Farris)
 Peacebound Trains (author: Haemi Balgassi)
 Saturdays and Teacakes (author: Lester L. Laminack)
 The Silence in the Mountains (author: Liz Rosenberg)
 Silver Packages: An Appalachian Christmas Story (author: Cynthia Rylant)
 So Far from the Sea (author: Eve Bunting)
 Something Beautiful (author: Sharon Dennis Wyeth)
 Where Is Grandpa? (author: T. A. Barron)

Book Awards
  Georgia Children's Picture Book Award 2005-2006
 Child Magazine Best Book of the Year 2003
 The International Reading Award Teachers' Choice Award 1996, 2000, 2004
 The International Reading Award Notable Book for a Global Society 1998
 Smithsonian's Notable Book 1995, 1996
 Junior Library Guild Selection 1998, 2001, 2006
 American Library Association (ALA)-Notable Book 1996, 2002
 Oppenheim Toy Portfolio: Gold Award Winner 2000
 Parents Magazine Best Children's Book of the Year 1998
 The Southeastern Booksellers' Association
 Children's Book Sense 76 Pick 2004
 Master Reading List, Volunteer State Book Award 2006-2007
 Children's Literature Choice Book
 Black History Top 25 Pick for Youth 1996
 Book Links Salutes a Few Good Books
 American Bookseller Pick of the List 1996, 1997
 A National Parenting Publication Award Honor Book, Selectors' Choice
 Skipping Stones Honor Award (A multicultural Children's Magazine)
 FOCAL Award Best Book Winner 1999
 Kansas State Reading Circle 2005
 NCSS/CBC Notable Children's Trade Book in the Field of Social Studies Chicago Tribune Top 10 Children Books 1996 San Francisco Chronicles Best Book List Notable Children's Trade Books in the Field of Social Studies 1995, 1997 Peggy Sharp, Ed.D Pick 2000 North Carolina Children's Book Award Golden Kite Award Honor 2000 Maryland Children's Book Award-Nominee 2001 Texas Bluebonnet Award-Nominee 2000 American Bookseller Pick of the List 1995, 1996 New York Public Library Top 100 Titles NCSS-CBC Notable Trade Book in Field of Social Studies 1998 Nest Literary Classics 2001 Asian/Pacific American Awards for Literature'' 2004, 2007

References

External links

 Chris Soentpiet Official Website
 Peacebound Trains on the United States of America Korean War Commemoration Website
The Dragon Lode: "Conversations with Yep and Soentpiet - Negotiation Between Cultures"

Media
Newsday: "From Dark to Light: An artist paints a new life through his books"
New York Daily News: "Children's Book Artist is a Medal Winner"
Korean Quarterly: "Evoking History with Art"

American people of Korean descent
Living people
American children's book illustrators
1970 births